Martin Luther King Boulevard/Mack Avenue is a streetcar station on the QLINE in Midtown Detroit, Michigan. The station opened for service on May 12, 2017. The station services the northern Brush Park and middle Cass Corridor neighborhoods.

The northbound platform is signed as Mack Avenue, and the southbound as MLK Boulevard, as the street changes names at Woodward.

Destinations
 University of Michigan Detroit Center
 Bonstelle Theatre
 Michigan State University Detroit Center
 Orchestra Hall (home of the Detroit Symphony Orchestra)

Station
The station is sponsored by the Detroit Medical Center. It is heated and features security cameras and emergency phones. Passenger amenities include Wi-Fi and arrival signs.

See also

Streetcars in North America

References

Tram stops of QLine
Railway stations in the United States opened in 2017